Dharruk may refer to:
Dharruk people, an Australian Aboriginal tribe
Dharruk language, their language
Dharruk, New South Wales, a suburb of Blacktown named after the tribe